Albania selected their Junior Eurovision Song Contest 2015 entry through Festivali i 52-të Mbarëkombëtar i Këngës për Fëmijë. The competing songs will be broken down into one semi-final taking place on 26 May 2015. Mishela Rapo and her song "Dambaje" will represent Albania.

Before Junior Eurovision

Festivali i Këngës për Fëmijë 
On 13 March 2015, it was announced that Albania will participate at the Junior Eurovision Song Contest 2015. On 6 May 2015 it was reported that the winner of Festivali i 52-të Mbarëkombëtar i Këngës për Fëmijë will represent  at the Junior Eurovision Song Contest 2015.

Participant

Mishela Rapo 

Mishela Rapo was born on 15 December 2000 in Tirana, Albania. In 2012, she attempted to represent Albania in the Junior Eurovision Song Contest 2012 with the song "Mama Mia (Te Amo)", but did not win. On 27 May 2015, Rapo was declared the winner of Festivali i 52-të Mbarëkombëtar i Këngës për Fëmijë with her song "Dambaje". She represented Albania in the Junior Eurovision Song Contest 2015, finishing in 5th place with 93 points.

Dambaje 

"Dambaje" is a song by the Albanian singer Mishela Rapo. It represented Albania at the Junior Eurovision Song Contest 2015 in Sofia, Bulgaria.

On 27 of May 2015, RTSH held the Festivali 53 i Femijeve contest. The winner of the contest would be selected to represent Albania at the forthcoming Junior Eurovision Song Contest. Mishela Rapo won the contest and, thus, won the right to represent Albania in Bulgaria on 21 November. The music is composed by Adrian Hila, while the lyrics are by Pandi Laço. Both have worked together on songs for Eurovision to represent Albania. While the song is performed in Albanian, it also has a line in six other languages. This song marks the first time Turkish has been used in a Junior Eurovision Song Contest entry.

At Junior Eurovision 

At the running order draw which took place on 15 November 2015, Albania were drawn to perform sixteenth on 21 November 2015, following  and preceding .

Voting

Detailed voting results
The following members comprised the Albanian jury:
 Zana Shuteriqi
 Eriona Rushiti
 Kristaq Koçi
 Enis Mulla
 Hajk Zaharian

Commentator and spokesperson

Notes

References 

2015
Albania
Junior Eurovision Song Contest